Radio Jaagriti 102.7 FM is a 24-hour radio station in Trinidad and Tobago formed by the Sanatan Dharma Maha Sabha to broadcast Hindu religious programming and to address the needs of the Hindu community in the media.

Radio Jaagriti 102.7 FM began broadcasts on 19 January 2007 at approximately 5:07 pm.

See also
 Hinduism in Trinidad and Tobago
 Sanatan Dharma Maha Sabha
Radio in Trinidad and Tobago

References

External links 
 jaagriti.com

Radio stations in Trinidad and Tobago
Hindu radio stations
Hinduism in Trinidad and Tobago
Radio stations established in 2007